The Whistle Song may refer to:

 "The Whistle Song" (Frankie Knuckles song), a 1991 single by American house music producer Frankie Knuckles
 "The Whistle Song" (DJ Aligator Project song), a 2000 song by Iranian-Danish producer DJ Aligator
 "There It Go (The Whistle Song)", a 2005 single by American rapper Juelz Santana
 "The Whistle Song", a song by Netsky from 2, 2012